Elvin is a given name. Notable people with the name include:

Elvin, Bishop of Várad (fl. 1189–1200), Hungarian prelate
Elvin Aliyev (born 1984), Azerbaijani professional footballer
Elvin Bale born in London, England, was a world-famous daredevil with Ringling Bros
Elvin Beqiri (born 1980), Albanian footballer
Elvin Bethea (born 1946), former American football defensive end
Elvin Bishop (born 1942), American blues and rock and roll musician and guitarist
Elvin J. Cassell (1896–1970), American football coach in the United States
Elvin W. Crane (1853–1909), American lawyer and Democratic party politician from New Jersey
Elvin C. Drake (1903–1988), American college track and field coach and athletics trainer
Elvin Feltner, (born 1929), American film producer, television broadcaster and telecommunications entrepreneur
Elvin Grey, (born 1989), Russian musician
Elvin Hayes (born 1945), retired American basketball player and radio analyst
Elvin R. Heiberg III (born 1932) United States Army general
Elvin Hutchison (1912–2001), American football player and official
Elvin Jamalov (born 1995), Azerbaijani footballer
Elvin Jones (1927–2004), jazz drummer of the post-bop era
Elvin A. Kabat (1914–2000), American biomedical scientist
Elvin Mammadov (born 1988), Azerbaijani footballer
Elvin Mesger (1919–1988), holder of the American Bowling Congress record for 800-or-better series
Elvin Ng (born 1980), actor in the Mediacorp stable in Singapore
Elvin Nimrod (born 1943), politician from the island of Grenada
Elvin Papik, the 26th head football coach for the Doane College Tigers located in Crete, Nebraska
Elvin Penner, Belizean politician
Elvin Ramírez (born 1987), Major League Baseball pitcher for the Washington Nationals
Elvin Santos (born 1963), Vice President of Honduras 2006–2008
Elvin C. Stakman (1885–1979), American plant pathologist
Elvin Tibideaux, fictional character on The Cosby Show
Elvin Yunusov (born 1994), Azerbaijani football player

See also 
 
Elvin, distributed event routing service using a publish/subscribe event delivery model
Elvin (surname)